The State Register of Heritage Places is maintained by the Heritage Council of Western Australia. , 928 places are heritage-listed in the City of Subiaco, of which 30 are on the State Register of Heritage Places.

List
The Western Australian State Register of Heritage Places, lists the following 30 state registered places within the City of Subiaco:

Notes

References

Subiaco